The British Independent Film Award for Best British Independent Film is an annual award given by the British Independent Film Awards (BIFA) to recognize the best British independent film. The award was first presented in the 1998 ceremony with Ken Loach's romantic drama My Name Is Joe being the first recipient of the award. The current winner is Charlotte Wells' debut drama film Aftersun.

The award goes to the writers, producers and directors that are fully credited for the film. According to the rules presented by BIFA, in order for a film to be considered "independent" and therefore be elegible for this award and the other categories, the financing of the film must come from an independent studio or do not exceed a budget of $22.5 million in case of a production from a major studio. Additionally, the origination of the film will also be taken into account when assessing the independence of studio-backed films, this referring to "whether it was initially conceived inside or outside of a studio system".

Winners and nominees

1990s

2000s

2010s

2020s

References

External links
 Official website

British Independent Film Awards
Awards for best film